The 2006–07 Connecticut Huskies men's basketball team represented the University of Connecticut in the 2006–07 collegiate men's basketball season. The Huskies completed the season with a 17–14 overall record. The Huskies were members of the Big East Conference where they finished with a 6–10 record. The Huskies played their home games at Harry A. Gampel Pavilion in Storrs, Connecticut and the Hartford Civic Center in Hartford, Connecticut, and they were led by twenty-first-year head coach Jim Calhoun.

Recruiting class

Roster
Listed are the student athletes who are members of the 2006–2007 team.

Schedule

|-
!colspan=10| Exhibition

|-
!colspan=10| Regular season

|-
!colspan=10| Big East tournament

References

UConn Huskies men's basketball seasons
Connecticut
2006 in sports in Connecticut
2007 in sports in Connecticut